Amowi, also known as Amoyu, is a village in Ashanti Region, Ghana. The population is approximately 500. The nearest city is Kumasi, 50 km away.

References

Populated places in the Ashanti Region